Wheeny Creek is a locality of Sydney, in the state of New South Wales, Australia. It is located in the City of Hawkesbury north-east of Kurrajong.

References

Suburbs of Sydney
City of Hawkesbury